The Mercedes-Benz 260 D, coded Mercedes-Benz W 138 according to internal works designation, was one of the first three diesel engined series produced passenger cars, together with 1933 Citroën Rosalie 11UD and the diesel version of the Hanomag Rekord. The 260 D was named in reference to its engine's cubic capacity. Nearly 2,000 vehicles were assembled until 1940, after which the Daimler-Benz group had to devote itself almost entirely to military manufacture.

Pilot series
First attempts by Daimler-Benz to assemble a 6-cylinder diesel engine in a Mercedes-Benz Mannheim chassis ultimately failed due to its enormous vibration. 1935 saw the successful installation of the smaller OM 138, 2545 cc overhead valve, 4-cylinder engine in a Mercedes-Benz 230 (W21) chassis. It employed the Bosch diesel fuel injection system and produced  at 3000 rpm. Branded as the 260 D, the car was introduced to the public at the 1936 Berlin Motor Show, although 13 units were already produced in 1935. The car proved to be a good seller.

170 pullman-landaulets based on the W21 chassis were built from 1936 to 1937, called the Nullserie and used only as taxis, with a three-speed plus overdrive transmission, without syncromesh on the first gear.

Second series
The second series or facelift was manufactured, from 1937 on, the regular production of the 260D based on the Mercedes-Benz W143, with a four-speed fully synchronized transmission. The chassis was based on contemporary Mercedes technology and had transverse leaf spring independent front suspension and swing axles at the rear. The brakes were hydraulic. A range of body types were made including saloons, landaulettes and cabriolets.

Production was stopped in 1939 as a result of World War II. After the war, the production of diesel engined cars was resumed with the Mercedes-Benz 170D in 1949. In total, 1.967 units of the 230 D were built since 1935.
 
A surviving example of the car is displayed at the Mercedes-Benz Museum in Stuttgart, Germany.

References

External links

260 D
1930s cars
Cars introduced in 1936